Ruth Attaway (June 28, 1910 – September 21, 1987) was an American film and stage actress.  Among the films she appeared in are Raintree County (1957), Porgy and Bess (1959) and Being There (1979).

Early life
Attaway was born on June 28, 1910, in Greenville, Mississippi. She was the daughter of physician W.A. Attaway, PhD.  Her siblings included a sister, Florence, and a brother, novelist and writer William. She graduated from the University of Illinois at Urbana–Champaign, where she majored in sociology.

Career

Theatre work
Attaway made her Broadway debut in 1936 in the Pulitzer Prize winning play, You Can't Take It with You.

Attaway was the first director of the New York Players Guild, a black repertory theater company formed in New York in 1945.

From 1954 to 1955, Attaway portrayed Anna Hicks in the play Mrs. Patterson at the National Theater.

From 1964 to 1967, Attaway was with the Repertory Society of Lincoln Center.

Film work
Attaway made her film debut by portraying Moll in The President's Lady (1953), opposite Susan Hayward and Charlton Heston.  She went on to play a variety of characters in film such as Philomena in The Young Don't Cry (1957), Serena in Porgy and Bess (1959), Edna in Conrack (1974) and Louise in Being There (1979).

Television work
In 1954, Attaway was within the cast of an unaired pilot titled Three's Company.

She also played Delia in the 1978 television movie, The Bermuda Depths.

Other ventures
In addition to acting, Attaway was also trained as a social worker and, between acting jobs, worked with the American Red Cross, the New York State Department of Social Welfare and New York's Metropolitan Hospital.

Honors
On November 10, 1953, Attaway was one of three people cited by the Coordinating Council For Negro Performers at a special benefit in Harlem.

Personal life and death
Attaway was married to Allan Morrison, an editor of Ebony.  He died on May 29, 1968, at the age of 51.

Attaway died on September 21, 1987, in New York Hospital of injuries resulting from a Manhattan apartment fire.  She was 77 years old.

Partial filmography
The President's Lady (1953) - Moll
The Young Don't Cry (1957) - Philomena
Raintree County (1957) - Parthenia (uncredited)
Porgy and Bess (1959) - Serena Robbins
Terror in the City (1964) - Farmer's Wife
Conrack (1974) - Edna
The Taking of Pelham One Two Three (1974) - Mayor's Nurse
The Bermuda Depths (1978) - Delia
Being There (1979) - Louise (final film role)

References

External links
 
 
 

1910 births
1987 deaths
20th-century African-American people
20th-century African-American women
20th-century American actresses
Accidental deaths in New York (state)
Actresses from Mississippi
Actresses from New York City
African-American actresses
American film actresses
American social workers
American stage actresses
Deaths from fire in the United States
People from Greenville, Mississippi
University of Illinois Urbana-Champaign alumni